Maru may refer to:

People
 Maru (given name), a Spanish given name, a shortened form of Maria Eugenia
 Maru (surname), a surname of Indic origin
 Maru (mythology), a Māori war god
 Ngāti Maru (disambiguation), several Māori tribes of New Zealand

Places
 Maru, Shwegu, a village in Kachin State, Burma
 Maru, Estonia,a  village in Halliste Parish, Viljandi County, Estonia
 Maru, Iran (disambiguation)
 Maru (Irbid), a village in Irbid, Jordan
 Maru, Kathmandu, a market and ceremonial square in Kathmandu, Nepal
 Maru, Nigeria, a Local Government Area in Zamfara State
 Maru-Aten, a palace or sun-temple in Armarna, Egypt
 Maru Pradesh, a region in the Indian state of Rajasthan
 Mount Maru (disambiguation) (丸山), the name for several mountains on Hokkaidō, Japan

Language
 In Japanese maru (kanji: ,), means circle; see 
 Marujirushi (correct mark); the opposite of batsu (×)
 Handakuten (a Japanese diacritical mark ( ゜)
 Maru language, one of several languages spoken among the Kachin people in Myanmar/Burma and China

Other uses
 Maru (cat), a Japanese Internet celebrity cat
 Maru, a 1971 novel by Bessie Head
 Maru, a common suffix to Japanese ship names; See Japanese ship-naming conventions
 Maru code (JN-39), a World War II code used by Japanese merchant ships
 An alternate term for the Ancient Indian weapon maduvu
 One of the ragas of the Sikh religion
 One layer in a kuruwa, a Japanese castle wall system

See also
 Măru (disambiguation)